This article shows the rosters of all participating teams at the women's softball tournament at the 2015 Pan American Games in Toronto. Rosters can have a maximum of 15 athletes.

Brazil announced their squad on April 14, 2015.

Mayra Akamine
Yip Kimberly Chan
Gabriela dos Santos
Veronika Fukunishi
Nilze Higa
Vivian Morimoto
Martha Murazawa
Thais Nagano
Roseanna Portioli
Camila Silva
Regina Chie Someya
Simone Suetsugu
Samira Tanaka
Maria Ueno
Bárbara Woll

Canada announced their squad on January 16, 2015.

Jenna Caira
Jocelyn Cater
Larissa Franklin
Sara Groenewegen
Megan Gurski
Karissa Hovinga
Joey Lye
Erika Polidori
Kaleigh Rafter
Sara Riske
Jenn Salling
Megan Timpf
Logan White
Natalie Wideman
Jen Yee



The Dominican Republic participated with the following athletes:

Karina de los Santos
Dhariana Familia
Geraldida Féliz
Yanela Gómez
Yuderca Matos
Josefina Mercedes
Geovanny Núñez
Luisa Nuñez
Danelis Ramírez
Eduarda Rocha
Lidizeth Soto
Aureliza Tejada
María Toribio
Anabel Ulloa
Elizabeth Vicioso

Puerto Rico's roster consisted of 15 athletes.

Karla Claudio
Dayanira Diaz
Quianna Diaz-Patterson
Elicia D'Orazio
Sahvanna Jaquish
Galis Lozada
Yairka Moran
Yahelis Munoz
Kiara Nazario
Aleshia Ocasio
Nicole Osterman
Gabriela Palacios
Shemiah Sanchez
Monica Santos
Yazmin Torres

The United States announced their squad on January 8, 2015.

Valerie Arioto
Ally Carda
Raven Chavanne
Amanda Chidester
Kellie Fox
Lauren Gibson
Janelle Lindvall
Haylie McCleney
Jessica Moore
Michelle Moultrie
Sara Nevins
Sierra Romero
Kelsey Stewart
Janie Takeda
Jaclyn Traina

References

Softball at the 2015 Pan American Games
Softball squads